The following outline is provided as an overview of and topical guide to chemical engineering:

Chemical engineering – deals with the application of physical science (e.g., chemistry and physics), and life sciences (e.g., biology, microbiology and biochemistry) with mathematics and economics, to the process of converting raw materials or chemicals into more useful or valuable forms. In addition to producing useful materials, modern chemical engineering is also concerned with pioneering valuable new materials and techniques – such as nanotechnology, fuel cells and biomedical engineering.

Essence of chemical engineering 

 Math
 Chemistry
 Physics
 Fluid Mechanics
 Chemical Reaction Engineering
 Thermodynamics
 Chemical Thermodynamics 
 Engineering Mechanics
 Fluid Dynamics
 Heat Transfer
 Mass Transfer
 Transport Phenomena
 Green Chemistry and Sustainability 
 Process Control
 Process Instrumentation
 Process Safety
 Unit Operation
 Process Design
 Chemical Process Modeling and Simulation
 Engineering Economics

Branches of chemical engineering 
 Biochemical engineering
 Biomedical engineering
 Biotechnology
 Ceramics
 Chemical process modeling
 Chemical Technologist
 Chemical reactor
 Chemical reaction engineering
 Distillation Design
 Electrochemistry
 Fluid dynamics
 Food engineering
 Heat transfer
 Mass transfer
 Materials science
 Microfluidics
 Nanotechnology
 Natural environment
 Plastics engineering
 Polymer engineering
 Process control
 Process design (chemical engineering)
 Separation processes (see also: separation of mixture)
 Crystallization processes
 Distillation processes
 Membrane processes
 Semiconductors
 Thermodynamics
 Transport phenomena
 Unit operations
 Unit Operations of Chemical Engineering

History of chemical engineering 

History of chemical engineering
 Batch production

General chemical engineering concepts 
 Chemical engineer
 Chemical reaction
 Distillation Design
 Fluid mechanics
 Heat transfer
 Mass transfer and equilibrium stages
 Operations involving particulate solids.
 Process design
 Transport Phenomena
 Unit operations
 Polymerization
 3D Plant Design 
 FEED

Leaders in chemical engineering 

 List of chemical engineers

See also 

 Outline of chemistry

References

External links 

 Computer Aids for Chemical Engineering Education (CACHE)
 Engineering Learning Resources Wiki
 What is a Chemical Engineer?
 Chemical Engineers' Resource Page
 History of Chemical Engineering Timeline
 American Institute of Chemical Engineers (USA)
 Institution of Chemical Engineers (UK)
 Canadian Society for Chemical Engineers
 Brazilian Association of Chemical Engineering (BRA)
 Engineers Australia (AUS)
 Chemical Engineering Information -Turkey (TR)
 Chemical Engineering Information Exchange)
 

Chemical engineering
Chemical engineering
Chemical engineering